Víctor González Fuentes was de facto president of Bolivia for less than a day, and is a former military general and a member of the military junta that ruled the country from 1971–1978. The junta included Juan Pereda, David Padilla, Wálter Guevara, Alberto Natusch, and Lydia Gueiler Tejada. Fuentes was Chairman of that junta for July 21, 1978.

Prior to control of Bolivia, he was a signatory of the 1975 Decree Law No. 12760 during the Presidency of Hugo Banzer.

References

Living people
Year of birth missing (living people)